Thomas, Tom or Tommy Callaghan may refer to:

Tommy Callaghan (footballer, born 1886) (1886–1917), English footballer
Tom Callaghan (active 1925–33), Scottish footballer who played for Scottish, Irish and English Football Leagues
Thomas Patrick Callaghan (born 1938), Irish long distance runner
Tommy Callaghan (born 1945), Scottish footballer who played for Celtic, Dunfermline Athletic, and Clydebank
Thomas Callaghan (judge) (1815–1863), Australian judge of the District Court of New South Wales
Thomas Callaghan, an alias of burglar and author Jack Black (1871–1932)

See also
Thomas O'Callaghan (1845–1931), Australian police officer 
Tom Callahan (1921–1996), American basketball player